The Lomonosov Mountains are a somewhat isolated chain of mountains extending  northeast–southwest, located  east of the Wohlthat Mountains in Queen Maud Land, Antarctica. They were discovered and first plotted from air photos by the Third German Antarctic Expedition, 1938–39, and were mapped from air photos and surveys by the Sixth Norwegian Antarctic Expedition, 1958–59. The mountains were remapped by the Soviet Antarctic Expedition, 1960–61, and named after Russian scientist Mikhail Lomonosov.

References

Mountain ranges of Queen Maud Land
Princess Astrid Coast